Lungtok Dawa born on 18th December 1998 is a Bhutanese international footballer who currently plays for Transport United FC. He made his first appearance for the Bhutan national football team in 2015 in their historic World Cup qualifying match against Sri Lanka. He also featured in a number of their second qualifying round matches and also featured in the 2015 SAFF Championship. Along with playing football he is also a college going student. Currently he is studying in Royal Thimphu College.

References

Bhutanese footballers
Bhutan international footballers
Living people
Association football forwards
1998 births
Expatriate footballers in India
Bhutanese expatriate sportspeople in India